Tanganoides is a genus of Australian intertidal spiders first described by V. T. Davies in 2005.

Species
 it contains six species:
Tanganoides acutus (Davies, 2003) – Australia (Tasmania)
Tanganoides clarkei (Davies, 2003) – Australia (Tasmania)
Tanganoides collinus (Davies, 2003) – Australia (Tasmania)
Tanganoides greeni (Davies, 2003) – Australia (Tasmania)
Tanganoides harveyi (Davies, 2003) – Australia (Victoria)
Tanganoides mcpartlan (Davies, 2003) – Australia (Tasmania)

References

Araneomorphae genera
Desidae
Spiders of Australia
Taxa named by Valerie Todd Davies